Leonardus Lessius (1 October 1554, in Brecht – 15 January 1623, in Leuven) was a Flemish moral theologian from the Jesuit order.

Life

At the age of thirteen the young Leonard won the Brecht scholarship to the University of Leuven. This university is the main place he will be identified with for the next fifty years. In 1567 he matriculated in an arts department called Le Porc (Porcus alit doctos), during the final oral exam he was merited the title of primus. 
He joined the Jesuits in 1572, and after theological studies in Rome under Francisco Suarez and Robert Bellarmine, he became professor of theology at the University of Leuven. In his early teaching years, he was involved in the predestination theological debate that was raging in Leuven in 1587–88 (against Baianism). Despite significant persecution and censorship that he receive as a result, Lessius supported the view of free will and predestination developed by Luis de Molina, which was seen by many theologians at the time as too little conservative position. In 1615 Pope Paul V thanked him personally for the services rendered to the Catholic Church.

Work

Lessius is now best known for his treatise De iustitia et iure (On Justice and Law) (1605), a commentary on the Secunda secundae of Aquinas's Summa Theologica, that went through more than 20 editions in the 17th century alone. It is probably the first in-depth moral theological approach to economic and financial questions. Lessius went to Antwerp, then a world business centre in rapid expansion, to study how banking and commerce were functioning. His experience gave weight to his ethical solutions to moral cases dealing with business and finance. He has been praised by modern historians of economics for the subtlety of its understanding of business matters involving interest. For example, Lessius clearly states the dependence of the price of an insurance contract on the risk of the event insured against. Among other things he gave guidelines for a new "just price" approach, accepting the fact that what was proposed by Thomas Aquinas was no longer workable in the 16th century.

His work On the Providence of the Deity, and the Immortality of the Soul, Against Atheists and Politicians, containing design arguments for the existence of God, was translated into English in 1631 under the title Rawleigh his Ghost.

From 1610 on, and already in poor health, he turned towards writing ascetical and theological books that had also much success.

Tomb

Lessius is buried in St. Michael Church, the historic Jesuit church in Leuven. His simple tomb is located in the baptistry, just to the north of the apse. Previously, he was interred at the nearby Jesuit college.

Works

De Iustitia et Iure, Lovania, 1605.  The first full English translation of the sections in this work on sales, legal securities, and insurance was recently published by Christian's Library Press as On Sales, Securities, and Insurance (2016).
De Bono Statu eorum qui vovent..., Colonia, 1615.
De perfectionibus moribusque divinis, Amberes, 1620.

See also 
Congregatio de Auxiliis

Notes

References
*Decock, Wim, Lessius and the Breakdown of the Scholastic Paradigm, Journal of the History of Economic Thought, 31 (2009), 57-78. 
Franklin, James, The Science of Conjecture: Evidence and Probability Before Pascal (Johns Hopkins University Press, 2001).
Gordon, B.T., Economic Analysis Before Adam Smith: Hesiod to Lessius (Macmillan, 1975).
Van Houdt, T. and Decock, W., Leonardus Lessius: traditie en vernieuwing (Antwerpen, Lessius Hogeschool, 2005)

 Lessius, Leonardus, On Sales, Securities, and Insurance. CLP Academic, 2016.

External links

Leonard Lessius in the Historical Archives of the Pontifical Gregorian University

1554 births
1623 deaths
Jesuits of the Spanish Netherlands
17th-century Latin-language writers
Flemish Jesuits
Roman Catholic theologians of the Spanish Netherlands
Catholic casuists
People from Brecht, Belgium
Sapienza University of Rome alumni
Academic staff of the Old University of Leuven
Old University of Leuven alumni
Catholic philosophers
Jesuit theologians
Jesuit philosophers